Ally is a commune in the Cantal department in the Auvergne region of south-central France.

The inhabitants of the commune are known as Allyçois or Allyçoises

Geography
Ally is located some 60 km south-west of Clermont-Ferrand and some 65 km south-east of Limoges in a straight line.  It is at least 30 km from the nearest national highway and access is by district roads the most direct being the D680 which runs north-east from Pleaux and enters the western border of the commune. It goes directly to the town then turns to exit the commune south-east to join with the road D922. The D681 also comes south from Mauriac to the village and the D29 comes from Drugeac in the west by a circuitous route to the village. The commune is mostly farmland although with some mountain slopes and forests in the north.

The river Auze flows north forming the eastern and then the northern border of the commune before flowing into the Dordogne south-west of Chalvignac. A number of streams feed this river from the commune including the Ruisseau de Peschaytou, Ruisseau de Terrieu, and Le Sione which forms part of the south-eastern border.

There are quite a number of hamlets and villages in the commune. These are:

Champell
Chavergne
Crucholles
Drignac
Fraissy
Ginalhac
Labro
Langlade
Le Breuil
Les Martres
Le Peuch
Le Pouget
Le Puy Soutro
Maissac
Monteil
Nebouillieres
Pommier
Tarneu
Veze

Neighbouring communes and villages

Administration

List of Successive Mayors of Ally

Population

Culture and heritage

Civil heritage
The commune has a number of buildings and structures that are registered as historical monuments:
The Chateau de la Vigne (15th century). The Chateau contains two items that are registered as historical objects:
A Mural: Diane bathing (17th century)
A Mural: Atalante and Méléagre (17th century)
The Chateau de la Vigne Park
The Maison Blanche Windmill (1882)
The Pargeat Windmill (1817)

Religious heritage
The commune has several religious buildings and structures that are registered as historical monuments:
The Church of Saint-Ferréol (12th century) was attended by Jean-Jacques Rousseau. The church contains a Container for relics: the Martyr Saint Vincent
The Church of Saint-Thibaud (11th century)

Notable People linked to the commune
Jean-Jacques Rousseau

See also 
 Communes of the Cantal department

References

External links
 Ally on the old National Geographic Institute website 
Ally on Géoportail, National Geographic Institute (IGN) website 
Ally on the 1750 Cassini Map

Communes of Cantal